Jorge Yabiel López Ramos (born February 10, 1993) is a Puerto Rican professional baseball pitcher for the Minnesota Twins of Major League Baseball (MLB). He has previously played in MLB for the Milwaukee Brewers, Kansas City Royals, and Baltimore Orioles. He made his MLB debut in 2015 and was an All-Star in 2022.

Professional career

Milwaukee Brewers
The Milwaukee Brewers selected López in the second round of the 2011 Major League Baseball draft out of the Caguas Military Academy in Caguas, Puerto Rico. He signed with the Brewers and made his professional debut with the Arizona League Brewers. He spent 2012 with the Dominican Summer League Brewers and Gulf Coast Brewers and 2013 with the Wisconsin Timber Rattlers. In 2014, López pitched for the Brevard County Manatees. In July he was selected to appear in the All-Star Futures Game. In 2015, he played for the Biloxi Shuckers of the Class AA Southern League. He had a 12–5 win–loss record, a 2.26 earned run average (ERA), and 137 strikeouts in  innings pitched for Biloxi. López was named the Brewers' minor league pitcher of the year and Southern League's most outstanding pitcher.

After Biloxi's 2015 season ended, the Brewers promoted López to the major leagues. He made his major league debut on September 29, 2015. In 2016, López began the season with the Colorado Springs Sky Sox of the Class AAA Pacific Coast League, but struggled, pitching to a 6.81 ERA in 17 games started. He was demoted to Biloxi. López pitched for the Puerto Rican national baseball team in the 2017 World Baseball Classic. In the 2017 season, López returned to Biloxi. He pitched to a 4.61 ERA as a starting pitcher, and then became a relief pitcher, and had a 3.62 ERA in that role. He made one appearance for the Brewers in 2017, pitching two innings and allowing one run on four hits on June 29.

During the 2017–18 offseason, López pitched for the Águilas Cibaeñas of the Dominican Professional Baseball League. López began the 2018 season with Colorado Springs. The Brewers again promoted him to the major leagues on April 11. He made one appearance, on April 16, before being returned to Colorado Springs on April 17.

Kansas City Royals
On July 27, 2018, López, along with teammate Brett Phillips, was traded to the Kansas City Royals for Mike Moustakas. On September 8, in his seventh major league start, López flirted with a perfect game as he retired 24 consecutive Minnesota Twins batters in order over eight innings. In the ninth inning, López surrendered a leadoff walk to Max Kepler and a hit to Robbie Grossman before walking off the mound at Target Field to a standing ovation. He became the first pitcher in Royals history to bring a perfect game into the ninth inning, besting Bret Saberhagen's seven-inning attempt vs. the Seattle Mariners. He was designated for assignment on August 7, 2020.

Baltimore Orioles
On August 9, 2020, López was claimed off waivers by the Baltimore Orioles. López ended the 2020 season with a 6.69 ERA and 28 strikeouts to partner with a 2–2 record over 10 appearances.

On August 21, 2021, after going 3–14 with a 6.35 ERA in 25 starts, Lopez was moved to the bullpen.

In 2022, the Orioles shifted López into the closer role and he collected his first save on April 11 in the Orioles 2–0 win against the Brewers.

Minnesota Twins
On August 2, 2022, the Orioles traded López to the Minnesota Twins in exchange for minor league pitching prospects Cade Povich, Yennier Canó, Juan Nunez, and Juan Rojas.

On January 13, 2023, López agreed to a one-year, $3.525 million contract with the Twins, avoiding salary arbitration.

Personal life
López and his wife, Karla, have a son, Mikael. Their son suffers from Familial Mediterranean fever since birth, and is waiting for an intestinal transplant. They had to leave their town of Cayey due to Hurricane Maria in 2017.

See also

 List of Major League Baseball players from Puerto Rico

References

External links

Jorge López Profile – Rotoworld.com

1993 births
Living people
People from Cayey, Puerto Rico
Major League Baseball players from Puerto Rico
Major League Baseball pitchers
Milwaukee Brewers players
Kansas City Royals players
Baltimore Orioles players
Minnesota Twins players
American League All-Stars
Arizona League Brewers players
Indios de Mayagüez players
Wisconsin Timber Rattlers players
Brevard County Manatees players
Biloxi Shuckers players
Dominican Summer League Brewers players
Omaha Storm Chasers players
2017 World Baseball Classic players
2023 World Baseball Classic players
Puerto Rican expatriate baseball players in the Dominican Republic